Kazimierz Kord (18 November 1930 – 29 April 2021) was a Polish conductor.  Between 1949 and 1955, he studied piano at the Leningrad Conservatory.  He also studied at the Academy of Music in Kraków.

He held major conducting positions with the Warsaw Philharmonic and the Southwest German Radio Symphony Orchestra.  His operatic guest conducting engagements included the first performance in Russian of Tchaikovsky's The Queen of Spades at the Metropolitan Opera (Met) in the 1972–1973 season, and both Aida at the Met and Eugene Onegin at the Royal Opera House, London in 1976.  His recordings include the first stereo version of Don Quichotte by Jules Massenet, with Nicolai Ghiaurov in the title role, Gabriel Bacquier as Sancho Panza, and Régine Crespin as Dulcinée.

He was Principal Guest Conductor and Music Advisor of the Pacific Symphony of Orange County, California (USA) for their 1989–1990 season.

In 2001 he received the Knight's Cross of the Polonia Restituta Order.

References

External links
Biography

1930 births
2021 deaths
Polish conductors (music)
Male conductors (music)
Alumni of the Academy of Music in Kraków
Recipients of the Order of Polonia Restituta
21st-century conductors (music)
21st-century male musicians
People from Kraków